Federico Gerardi (born 10 December 1987) is an Italian footballer who plays as a striker for  club Vis Pesaro.

Career
Born in Pordenone, in the Friuli-Venezia Giulia region, Gerardi started his career 65 km away at Venezia of Venice, Veneto. Due to bankruptcy of Venezia, he joined Udinese Primavera Team in August 2005, which is in Udine, Friuli-Venezia Giulia region and a historic regional capital. He then spent 5⅓ seasons on loan to lower divisions, started in January 2007.

In January 2013 he was sold to Reggina Calcio.

On 8 July 2014 he was signed by Cittadella in a 2-year contract.

On 29 July 2019 he joined Rimini.

On 19 October 2020 he moved to Gubbio. On 29 January 2021 he signed with Cavese. On 31 August 2021 he joined Picerno.

On 19 January 2023, Gerardi signed with Vis Pesaro.

References

External links
 
 aic.football.it  
 

1987 births
People from Pordenone
Footballers from Friuli Venezia Giulia
Association football forwards
Living people
Italian footballers
Udinese Calcio players
U.S. Pistoiese 1921 players
A.C. Monza players
A.S.D. Sangiovannese 1927 players
U.S. Salernitana 1919 players
A.S. Cittadella players
A.C. Ancona players
A.S.D. Portogruaro players
F.C. Grosseto S.S.D. players
Ascoli Calcio 1898 F.C. players
Reggina 1914 players
Como 1907 players
FeralpiSalò players
Pordenone Calcio players
S.S. Monopoli 1966 players
Rimini F.C. 1912 players
A.S. Gubbio 1910 players
Cavese 1919 players
AZ Picerno players
Vis Pesaro dal 1898 players
Serie A players
Serie B players
Serie C players